The Vermont Railway  is a shortline railroad in Vermont and eastern New York, operating much of the former Rutland Railway. It is the main part of the Vermont Rail System, which also owns the Green Mountain Railroad, the Rutland's branch to Bellows Falls. The trackage is owned by the Vermont Agency of Transportation except in New York, where VTR operates a line owned by the Boston and Maine Corporation. The rail line employs about 150 people in Vermont.

History
The Rutland Railway was the only north-south line through western Vermont. A strike in 1953 precipitated the company's ending passenger service. Another strike shut down freight operations on September 25, 1961. The government of Vermont purchased the main line south of Burlington, as well as a branch to Bennington,  total, and the new Vermont Railway, incorporated on October 25, 1963, began operations on January 6, 1964. The company's first president was Jay Wulfson, who came from the Middletown and New Jersey Railroad.

During the early years of the Vermont Railway, money was spent replacing old locomotives and rolling stock the railroad had inherited from the Rutland. It bought several locomotives, both new and used. It also leased several hundred freight cars.

The railroad continued to expand, entering the intermodal business in 1965, and acquiring the Clarendon and Pittsford Railroad in 1972, which gave VTR access to a limestone plant near Florence, Vermont. VTR retained the Clarendon and Pittsford name as a separate legal entity operating the acquired trackage. In the late 1970s several senior officials died, including Wulfson. The railroad grossed more than $2 million in revenues for the first time. Net earnings were about $20,000 a year, which was spent in improving the railroad.

In 1982, VTR repaid the state of Vermont for the trackage the state had bought in 1964 to allow VTR to begin operations. A year later, VTR bought  of track between Rutland and Whitehall, New York from the Delaware and Hudson Railway and assigned it to its Clarendon and Pittsford subsidiary. During the first years after the purchase, a rehabilitation project was begun, upgrading the roadbed as well as the track and ties. Since the line was upgraded to higher standards, Whitehall has become a major interchange point between VTR and the D&H (now Canadian Pacific after its acquisition of the D&H). Since 1996, Amtrak's Ethan Allen Express has been operating on the Rutland - Whitehall section.

In 1997, the Vermont Railway purchased the Green Mountain Railroad, which ran  from Rutland to Bellows Falls. This led to the formation of an umbrella company, named the Vermont Rail System, which owned both railroads, as well as several other shortlines in Vermont and New York.

VTR has been the designated operator of the New York & Ogdensburg Railway for over a decade (as of 2021) . This short line was once the western end of the Rutland Railway Ogdensburg Division and operates over the 26-mile line segment between Ogdensburg and the CSX connection at Norwood, NY.

VTR planned to construct a new  spur line in Middlebury, Vermont, to serve a quarry. In early 2011, the company created a new subsidiary railroad called the Otter Creek Railroad to purchase land and construct trackage in preparation for construction to begin in early 2013, with a late 2014 completion date. The quarry cancelled the project in August 2012 because it was no longer economically viable.

Routes
The VRS owns and operates the following additional rail line:

 Connecticut River Line ( Newport, Vermont to White River Junction). This is speed-limited by the slowest track in the system to FRA class 1:  for freight;  for passengers.

Traffic
The Vermont Railway moves a wide variety of freight, as well as furnishing track to an Amtrak passenger train, the Ethan Allen Express. VTR moves large amounts of stone products from quarries in western Vermont, largely limestone in the form of slurry from OMYA mines north of Rutland. VTR also moves large amounts of petroleum products into Vermont, including unit trains of fuel oil from Albany, New York, to Burlington.

Locomotive fleet
As of July 2021, the Vermont Railway's fleet consisted of:

Former fleet

References

External links

Rutland Railway Association

Vermont railroads
New York (state) railroads
New Hampshire railroads
Railway companies established in 1964
1964 establishments in Vermont
Spin-offs of the Rutland Railroad
American companies established in 1964